The 1965 Stanley Cup Finals was the championship series of the National Hockey League's (NHL) 1964–65 season, and the culmination of the 1965 Stanley Cup playoffs. It was contested between the Chicago Black Hawks and the Montreal Canadiens. The Canadiens won the best-of-seven series, four games to three, to win the Stanley Cup. The seventh and final game of this series marked the first time that any NHL competition had taken place during the month of May, and at the time it was the latest finishing date for an NHL season.

Paths to the Finals
Montreal defeated the three-time defending champion Toronto Maple Leafs 4–2 to advance to the finals and Chicago defeated the Detroit Red Wings 4–3.

Game summaries
This was the last final until  that this happened. Gump Worsley made his first Finals appearance after 12 years in the league and recorded two shutouts, including the one in game seven. Jean Beliveau was the inaugural winner of the Conn Smythe Trophy as playoff MVP, scoring eight goals and eight assists in thirteen games.

Jean Béliveau wins first Conn Smythe Trophy

Stanley Cup engraving
The 1965 Stanley Cup was presented to Canadiens captain Jean Beliveau by NHL President Clarence Campbell following the Canadiens 4–0 win over the Black Hawks in game seven.

The following Canadiens players and staff had their names engraved on the Stanley Cup

1964–65 Montreal Canadiens

See also
 1964–65 NHL season

Notes

References

 Podnieks, Andrew; Hockey Hall of Fame (2004). Lord Stanley's Cup. Bolton, Ont.: Fenn Pub., pp. 12, 50. 

Stanley Cup
Stanley Cup Finals
Chicago Blackhawks games
Montreal Canadiens games
Ice hockey competitions in Chicago
Ice hockey competitions in Montreal
Stanley Cup Finals
Stanley Cup Finals
Stanley Cup Finals
Stanley Cup Finals
1960s in Chicago
Stanley Cup Finals
1960s in Montreal
1965 in Quebec